Rákosfalva may refer to:

Rákosfalva (Budapest), neighbourhood of Budapest
Rákosfalva station, suburban railway station in Rákosfalva
Rákosfalva, the Hungarian name for Poiana Botizii village, Maramureș County, Romania